Kris Ellis is an American businesswoman, lobbyist, and a former politician from Idaho. Ellis was a Republican member of Idaho House of Representatives.

Early life 
On April 3, 1963, Ellis was born in Corvallis, Oregon.

Education 
In 1985, Ellis earned a Bachelor of Science degree in business from Oregon State University.

Career 
In 1985, Ellis became a manager/director of Professional Food Service Management, until 1992. In 1992, as a business woman, Ellis became the owner of Idaho Ruby's Catering.

On November 7, 2000, Ellis won the election and became a Republican member of Idaho House of Representatives for District 3, seat B. Ellis defeated JoAnn Harvey with 56.9% of the votes.

On November 5, 2002, Ellis sought a seat in District 4, seat B unsuccessfully. Ellis was defeated by George Sayler with 48.7% of the votes. Ellis received 48.1% of the votes.

Ellis is a co-owner of a real estate and property management company in Boise, Idaho.

Ellis is a lobbyist and a partner with Eiguren Ellis, a public policy firm in Boise, Idaho.

Personal life 
Ellis's husband is Curtis Ellis. They have two children. Ellis and her family live in Coeur d'Alene, Idaho.

References

External links 
 Kris Ellis at idahopsych.org
 Kris Ellis at zillow.com
 Eiguren-Ellis at boisechambrr.org

1963 births
Living people
Republican Party members of the Idaho House of Representatives
Oregon State University alumni
Politicians from Corvallis, Oregon
People from Coeur d'Alene, Idaho
21st-century American politicians
21st-century American women politicians